Boumphrey is a surname. Notable people with the name include

 Colin Boumphrey (1897–1945),  English cricketer
 Donald Boumphrey (1892–1971),  English cricketer
 Peter Boumphrey (1919–2004),  British alpine skier
 Pauline Boumphrey (1886–1959),  American sculptor

Surnames